Mount Fitch can refer to
 Mount Fitch, a subordinate peak of Mount Greylock, located in Massachusetts.
Mount Fitch, Northern Territory, a mountain of approximately 70 m in Australia, part of the old Rum Jungle, Northern Territory uranium mines near Batchelor, 64 km south of Darwin, Northern Territory.

References